Spreader may refer to:

 Broadcast spreader, an agricultural machinery or lawn care tool designed to spread seed, fertilizer, lime, sand, ice melt, etc.
 Spreader (railroad), a kind of maintenance of way equipment designed to spread or shape ballast profiles
 Hydraulic spreader, a tool used by emergency crews in vehicle extrication
 Spreader (sailboat), a spar on a sailboat used to deflect the shrouds to allow them to better support the mast
 Spreader bar, a BDSM bondage device
 Spreader (lifting), a lifting device used to distribute forces appropriately for structural or interference reasons
 Manure spreader, an agricultural machinery designed to spread manure
 Spreader (mining), a heavy equipment used in surface mining and mechanical engineering/civil engineering